The 2018–19 Elite One Championship was the 84th season of France's domestic rugby league competition and 17th known as the Elite One Championship. Ten teams competed in the regular season playing 19 matches each from November 2018 to June 2019, with the top six teams playing a three-week finals series throughout June 2019. 

Saint-Estève XIII Catalan won their second Elite One Championship beating minor premiers AS Carcassonne in the final 32–24 after finishing 2nd in the regular season.

Teams

Format

Regular season
Each team was scheduled to every other team twice, once at home and the other away. Each team then played another team again during Magic Weekend that was held on Saturday, April 13 and Sunday, April 14, 2019, in Carcassonne, to make a total of 19 regular season matches for each team.

Finals series
At the end of the regular season, the top six of the regular season advance to the knockout stage. 1st and second receive a bye for the first week of finals as third plays sixth (Qualifying Final 1) and fourth plays fifth (Qualifying Final 2), with the losers of both matches eliminated. First then plays the winner of Qualifying final 1 and second then plays the winner of Qualifying Final 2. The winners of these two matches play in Grand Final on 29 June at  Stadium Municipal d'Albi in Albi.

Regular season

Home and Away

Source:

Magic Weekend
Magic Weekend was held on Saturday, April 13 and Sunday, April 14, 2019, with all matches being played in Carcassonne. All match winners would be awarded 4 points instead of the regular 3.

Table

 
 3 points for a victory
 4 points for a victory in Magic Weekend
 1 point bonus for losing team if the margin is less than 12
 If two teams have equal points then the separation factor is point difference. If a team has a greater point difference they rank higher on the table.

Finals series

Qualifying Finals

Limoux vs Albi

Lezignan vs Villeneuve

Semi-finals

Carcassonne vs Limoux

Catalan vs Lezignan

Final

Teams

Match Summary

References 

Rugby league competitions in France
2018 in French rugby league
2019 in French rugby league